

Teams

Changes from last season
Teams promoted from 1982–83 Yugoslav Second League
 Čelik
 Priština

Teams relegated to 1983–84 Yugoslav Second League
 17th place: OFK Belgrade
 18th place: Galenika Zemun

Overview

League table

Results

Winning squad
Red Star Belgrade (coach Gojko Zec)

Top scorers

Attendance

Overall league attendance per match: 9,912 spectators

See also
1983–84 Yugoslav Second League
1983–84 Yugoslav Cup

External links
Yugoslavia Domestic Football Full Tables

Yugoslav First League seasons
Yugo
1983–84 in Yugoslav football